Chahar Taq (also Romanized as Chahār Ţāq) is a village in Bala Velayat Rural District, Bala Velayat District, Bakharz County, Razavi Khorasan Province, Iran. At the 2006 census, its population was 685, in 158 families.

References 

Populated places in Bakharz County